Schillingsfürst is a municipality  in the district of Ansbach, in Bavaria, Germany. It is situated 12 km southeast of Rothenburg ob der Tauber, and 23 km west of Ansbach.

Schillingsfürst castle (Schloss Schillingsfürst) is the home of the princely Hohenlohe-Schillingsfürst family.

Notable people
 The Bavarian Lieutenant General and Acting War Minister Hugo Ritter von Bosch (1782–1865) was born in Schillingsfürst.

References

Ansbach (district)